is a railway station located in the city of Kitaakita, Akita Prefecture, Japan, operated by the third sector railway operator Akita Nairiku Jūkan Railway.

Lines
Ani-Matagi Station is served by the Nariku Line, and is located 52.3 km from the terminus of the line at Takanosu Station.

Station layout
The station consists of one side platform serving a single bi-directional track. The station is unattended.

Adjacent stations

History
Ani-Matagi Station opened on April 1, 1989, serving the town of Ani, Akita.

Surrounding area
 Yasu Falls – One of Japan's Top 100 Waterfalls

External links

 Nairiku Railway Station information 

Railway stations in Japan opened in 1989
Railway stations in Akita Prefecture
Kitaakita